The Museum of Romanticism (Spanish: Museo del Romanticismo) is a State-owned art museum located in Madrid, Spain. It was inaugurated in 1924 as Museo Romántico.

History 

The museum is housed at Calle de San Mateo 13. It was linked since its inception to the patronage of the Marquis of Vega-Inclán. The museum opened on 1 June 1924. The building was purchased by the Spanish State three years after the inauguration of the museum, in 1927. The overseeing institution and the entire collection of the Marquis was bequeathed to the Spanish State after the death of the former in 1942.

The building, dating from the late 18th-century, consists of two stories plus an attic floor, which is not open to the public.

Both the collection and the building were protected as historical-artistic monument in 1962.

The museum's exhibits are presented in the context of a historic house with a dining room, billiard room etc. They include items related to the romantic writer Mariano José de Larra.

In November 2009, the Council of Ministers determined the renaming of the museum to Museo Nacional del Romanticismo.

Collection 
Some of the landmark items exhibited at the museum include painting works by Francisco de Goya (San Gregorio Magno), Leonardo Alenza (Satira del suicidio romántico, Sátira del suicidio por amor and El dios grande), Valeriano Domínguez Bécquer (El conspirador carlista), Antonio Carnicero (Retrato de Godoy), José Aparicio (Desembarco de Fernando VII), Joaquín Espalter (La familia Flaquer), Vicente López Portaña (Retrato del Marqués de Remisa), Antonio María Esquivel (El general Prim a caballo and Retrato de Alfredito Romea), Eugenio Lucas Velázquez (Cueva de bandidos), Charles Porion (Isabel II pasando revista a las tropas), Federico de Madrazo y Kuntz (Retrato del Duque de Rivas, Retrato de la Duquesa de Rivas, and Retrato de Julián Romea), José de Madrazo (Retrato de Fernando VII a caballo), Jenaro Pérez Villaamil (Puerta de Serranos en Valencia), Joaquín Sorolla (Retrato del Marqués de la Vega-Inclán), Manuel Cabral Bejarano (La copla), José Gutiérrez de la Vega (Retrato de Isabel II and Retrato de Larra) and Francisco de Zurbarán (San Francisco).

Gallery paintings

Gallery museum

References 
Citations

Bibliography

External links 
 Official website
Museum of Romanticism (Madrid) within Google Arts & Culture

Romanticism
Romanticism
Historic house museums in Spain
Romanticism
Museums established in 1924
1924 establishments in Spain
Bien de Interés Cultural landmarks in Madrid
Buildings and structures in Justicia neighborhood, Madrid